Air Rarotonga is an airline based in Rarotonga, Cook Islands and is ‘The Airline of the Cook Islands’. It operates inter-island and regional scheduled services throughout the Cook Islands and to Tahiti. It also operates chartered flights to French Polynesia, Niue, Samoa and Tonga. Its main base and hub is Rarotonga International Airport.

History
The airline was established in February 1978 and started operations in July 1978 with a Cessna 337 aircraft. The company is owned by three private investors. More than 70,000 passengers travel between its island destinations each year.

Destinations
Following is a list of destinations Air Rarotonga flies to as part of its scheduled services, .

Since August 2022 Air Rarotonga operates international flights to Tahiti using their own aircraft. 

Previously, the airline codeshared with Air Tahiti on flights between Rarotonga and Tahiti. Air Rarotonga also code shares with Air New Zealand for flights between Rarotonga and Aitutaki with Air Rarotonga being the operator.

The airline also offers scenic flights over Rarotonga and air charter services to neighbouring Pacific Island countries including Tahiti, Niue, Tonga, Samoa, Fiji and Kiribati.

The airline also operates air ambulance evacuations from all island airports in the Cook Islands and on to Auckland when required.

Fleet
As of October 2019 the Air Rarotonga fleet includes the following aircraft:

In February 2016, the airline added its first Jet to their fleet.

References

External links

Airlines of the Cook Islands
Airlines established in 1978
Rarotonga
1978 establishments in the Cook Islands
Avarua